For the passenger steamer that sank in 1901, see SS Islander

The steamboat Islander (1) operated in the early 1900s as part of the Puget Sound Mosquito Fleet.  Islander (1) a steamboat built in 1904, should not be confused with Islander (2), an 89' long motor passenger/freight boat built in 1921 for service on the same route.

Construction
Islander was built in 1904 by J.A. Scribner at Newhall, Washington for Capt. Andrew Newhall.  Islander was intended to replace the Buckeye on the Bellingham Bay-San Juan Islands route. Islander was 72 feet long, with beam of 18.9 feet and a 9 foot depth of hold.  In overall size the vessel was 163 gross tons and 87 registered tons.  In 1909 the vessel required a crew of seven.  The steam engine generated 200 indicated horsepower.

Operations
Capt. Newhall ran Islander on the San Juan Islands mail route until about 1909 when John S. McMillan, of Roche Harbor formed the San Juan Navigation Co., which placed the steamer Vashonian on the run from Seattle to Roche Harbor, where travelers could transship to the steamer Burton to proceed further to Bellingham.  In 1910, when Captain Newhall’s mail contract expired, he could not compete with the well-financed San Juan Navigation Co., and Islander was forced to tie up at Decatur Island.  Islander had also encountered tough competition from Capt. William H. Kasch, who running the 65' long gasoline-powered launch Yankee Doodle was able to race ahead of Islander, beating her to all the landings and picking up cargo and passengers before Islander could get to the dock.

Sale to Mexican interests
Captain Basford and his son charted Islander for a while and ran Islander on the San Juan Islands route, however they did not succeed and Islander was sold to a Mexican concern. How long Islander remained in Mexico is unknown, although she appears to have either never been transferred or at least returned by 1920 or so, when the vessel was transferred from Puget Sound to California. Another source indicates that the sale to Mexican owners did not happen until about 1920.

Loss
The coastwise steamer La Feliz(formerly Islander), grounded near Watsonville, California with a sizable cargo of Fireman's Fund-insured sardines aboard. Artichoke rancher who owned the land wanted $500 to let the salvors cross his land; under marine law no payment is required. Rancher kept them off first with a rifle, later by flooding the access road. Expediency overrule principle and the Company paid.

Notes

References 
 Newell, Gordon R., ed., H.W. McCurdy Marine History of the Pacific Northwest,  Superior Publishing Co., Seattle, WA (1966)
 U.S. Dept. of the Treasury, Bureau of Statistics, Annual List of Merchant Vessels of the United States (for year ending June 30, 1909), Monterey Bay National Marine Sanctuary http://channelislands.noaa.gov/shipwreck/dbase/mbnms/lafeliz.html

Steamboats of Washington (state)
Propeller-driven steamboats of Washington (state)
Ships built in Washington (state)
1904 ships
History of San Juan County, Washington
History of Whatcom County, Washington